Tadas Simaitis (born 29 December 1990) is a Lithuanian footballer who plays as a goalkeeper for Jonava.

Career
He started his career in Šiauliai.

On 20 February 2012, he was transferred from Šiauliai to Romanian club Oțelul Galați. On 23 November 2012, Simaitis made his debut for the Romanian side, in Liga I game against Dinamo București.

In June 2015, Simaitis signed with Azerbaijan Premier League side Kapaz.

Signed a contract with FK Jonava on 14 July 2017, during the summer transfers.

From July 2018 he is FK Jonava sports director.

Career statistics

Club

References

External links
 
 

1990 births
Living people
People from Klaipėda
Association football goalkeepers
Lithuanian footballers
Lithuania international footballers
Lithuanian expatriate footballers
Expatriate footballers in Romania
Expatriate footballers in Azerbaijan
A Lyga players
Liga I players
Azerbaijan Premier League players
ASC Oțelul Galați players
FK Klaipėdos Granitas players
Kapaz PFK players
FC Šiauliai players